Noel Fielke (born 23 December 1966) is an Australian cricketer. He played five first-class matches and three List A matches for South Australia in 1992/93.

See also
 List of South Australian representative cricketers

References

External links
 

1966 births
Living people
Australian cricketers
South Australia cricketers
Cricketers from Adelaide